List of dump truck manufacturers.

Tractor units

 Ashok Leyland
 BEML India Ltd
 CAMC
 Chevy
 DAF CF, 95 XF
 Davis Trailer & Equipment
 Dongfeng Liuqi
 Ford
 GMC
 HEPCO
 Hino Motors (Toyota)
 Leader Trucks
 International
 Isuzu
 Iveco Eurotrakker, Eurostar
 Kamaz
 Kenworth
 Kress Corporation:200CII.
 Mack
 MAN
 MAZ
 Mahindra
 Mercedes-Benz Actros, Axor
 Micro-Vett
 Mitsubishi Fuso Truck and Bus Corporation
 Peterbilt
 Perlini
 Renault Trucks
 ROMAN
 Scania AB 220, 340, 360, 460
 SISU
 ST Kinetics
 Sterling Trucks
 Tata Motors
 Tata Daewoo
 TBEI
 UD
 Volvo FH12 and Volvo FM12

Semi-trailer

 Schmitz Cargobull
 Seri Zenith
 Voltrailer
 Wielton

See also
Dump truck
Tractor unit
Semi-trailer and semi-trailer truck
List of American truck manufacturers

External links

Manufacturers
 Dump truck
Truck-related lists
Dump truck